The German-language surname Schmieden or its nobility form von Schmieden (literally meaning "of smiths") may refer to:

 (1892-1979), German diplomat
Heino Schmieden German architect 
Viktor Schmieden German surgeon 

German-language surnames

de:Schmieden (Begriffsklärung)